Spur Corporation (doing business as Spur Steak Ranches) is a steakhouse franchise restaurant chain originating from South Africa with a focus on family dining. The head office of Spur Corporation is situated in Century City, Cape Town. Although the founding and flagship brand is the Spur steakhouse restaurants, the company owns a number of other, predominantly South African, restaurant brands. Spur Steak Ranches is a themed South African family favourite and is fondly known as "the official restaurant of the South African family"; as such, most Spur restaurants include a children's play area.

History and growth 

In 1967 founder and executive chairman, Allen Ambor, opened the Golden Spur on Dean Street in Newlands, Cape Town in South Africa. Ambor started the first restaurant with R2,000 of his own money, R4,000 from his father and an additional R5,000 from a partner who was eventually bought out; amounting to a total starting capital of R11,000. The restaurant was opened on the 24 October 1967. The original restaurant moved to a new location at the corner of Dean and Main Road in the 2000s and closed in 2020.

A second Spur, the Seven Spur, was opened in Sea Point, Cape Town soon after the 1967 opening. After the success of the second Spur Ambor decided on a franchise model to facilitate the spread of the restaurants across the country.

The Spur Group consists of Spur International, Spur Steak Ranches, Panarottis Pizza Pasta, John Dory’s Fish Grill Sushi, Captain Dorego's, The Hussar Grill, RocoMamas, Spur Grill & Go, Nikos Coalgrill Greek and Casa Bella. It currently has 569 outlets worldwide, with restaurants in various parts of Africa, Mauritius, the Middle East and Australasia. In March 2018, Spur Corporation sold Captain Dorego's.

Operations
Spur Steak Ranches is a subsidiary of Spur Corporation, one of the largest restaurant companies in South Africa.

It has its headquarters in Century City, Cape Town, with regional offices in Johannesburg and Durban as well as an international office in Amsterdam, the Netherlands, supporting the company’s international operations.

Spur Steak Ranches’ contribution to Spur Corporation’s restaurant turnover is 61%.

Restaurants are owned by franchisees or directly by the company. As of 31 December 2018, Spur Steak Ranches had 323 stores located in 15 countries. The total restaurants in South Africa is 284 with 39 in other countries.

Africa and Mauritius
 Botswana
 Eswatini
 Ethiopia
 Kenya
 Lesotho
 Malawi
 Namibia
 Nigeria

 South Africa

 Tanzania
 Uganda
 Zambia
 Mauritius

Australasia
 Australia
 New Zealand
In 2020, the chain was forced to temporarily close all of restaurants amidst the COVID-19 pandemic.

Products
Spur Steak Ranches’ core product offering consists of steaks, ribs and burgers. In addition to these, the brand also sells chicken, schnitzels, seafood, wraps, sandwiches, salads, desserts, breakfasts and a dedicated children’s menu. The burgers have four options: beef, chicken, soya and rib. Furthermore, there are many plant based options available including the Beyond Burger.

Spur Steak Ranches also sells food to takeaway, delivering in some locations.

Procurement, manufacturing and distribution 
Spur Steak Ranches operates a sauce manufacturing facility that supplies franchisees with the brand’s sauces. Its sauces and marinades are also retailed in major South African retailers, along with certain products, which are externally manufactured under licence, such as frozen ribs and burger patties.

Panarottis Pizza Pasta 
The company also owns the Panarottis pizza and pasta restaurant chain. This chain was started in 1990 and has 84 outlets. In addition, the Spur Group purchased a 60% shareholding in John Dory’s Fish and Grill in 2004. John Dory's is a KwaZulu-Natal-based franchise with 54 outlets.

Controversy 
In March 2017, a racially charged incident occurred between two customers in a South African Spur Steak Ranch restaurant when a black African family got into an expletive-filled argument with a white Afrikaner family, after the black child reportedly hit the white child. The restaurant banned the white family, but not the black family. White Afrikaners criticised and ultimately boycotted the restaurant, which was staffed by black Africans, for siding with the black family, as well as for not doing more to break up the fight. The restaurant chain also received criticism for its slow official response, which was judged inadequate.

See also
 List of restaurants in South Africa

References

External links
Official website
Spur Corporation

Restaurants established in 1967
Companies listed on the Johannesburg Stock Exchange
Food and drink companies based in Cape Town
Restaurant franchises
Restaurant chains in South Africa
Steakhouses
1967 establishments in South Africa
Restaurants
Restaurants in South Africa
Newlands, Cape Town